Cosmote Sport is a pay sports service in Greece and is owned by OTE.  It launched in 2009 as Conn-x TV Sports and is currently available via OTE's Pay-TV services Cosmote TV via IPTV and satellite. It consists of nine channels and features live football coverage (over 100 Live matches per month) from top leagues in Europe including English Premier League, as well as exclusive coverage of 8 teams of Super League and the Greek Cup. It also airs coverage of other sports including Formula 1, Volleyball and Tennis. Also, Cosmote TV has the rights to show UEFA Champions League, UEFA Europa League and the newly UEFA Europa Conference League exclusively for the next 3 years (2021–2024).

Channels and content
Cosmote Sport operates ten multiplex channels:
Cosmote Sport Highlights HD
Highlights from all content
Cosmote Sport 1HD
Cosmote Sport 2HD
Cosmote Sport 3HD
Football Broadcasts and shows
Cosmote Sport 4HD
Basketball Broadcasts and shows
Cosmote Sport 5HD
Motorsports Broadcasts and shows
Cosmote Sport 6HD
Tennis, Volleyball, Handball Broadcasts and shows
Cosmote Sport 7HD
Cosmote Sport 8HD
Cosmote Sport 9HD

Channels that fill live broadcasts when the 6 channels are full on their Schedule of Live Broadcasts. These channels are broadcasting every sport and event which Cosmote Sport has acquired

Sports

Football
Super League (Home matches of Olympiacos, Panathinaikos, AEK, Volos, Lamia, OFI, Panetolikos and Ionikos)
Greek Cup
UEFA Champions League
UEFA Europa League
UEFA Europa Conference League
UEFA Super Cup
UEFA Youth League
Emirates FA Cup
FA Community Shield
EFL Championship
EFL League One
EFL League Two
Copa del Rey
Serie A
Liga Portugal Bwin
FPF Supertaça Cândido de Oliveira
Scottish Premiership
Scottish League Cup
CONMEBOL Libertadores
CONMEBOL Sudamericana
CONMEBOL Recopa Sudamericana
Saudi Professional League

Basketball
NBA
WNBA
Basketball Champions League
Liga ACB
Copa del Rey de Baloncesto
Spanish Basketball Super Cup
Basketbol Süper Ligi
Turkish Basketball Cup

Volleyball
CEV Champions League
CEV Women's Champions League
CEV Cup
Women's CEV Cup
CEV Challenge Cup
CEV Women's Challenge Cup

Handball
EHF Champions League
Handball-Bundesliga
DHB-Pokal
DHB-Supercup

Motorsports
MotoGP/Moto2/Moto3
MotoE
Red Bull MotoGP Rookies Cup
WRC
World Rallycross Championship
European Rally Championship
W Series
Extreme E

Tennis
ATP Tour 250
ATP Tour 500
ATP Tour Masters 1000
ATP Finals
Next Generation ATP Finals
World Tennis Championship
Billie Jean King Cup

Athletics
World Athletics Continental Tour (Gold)
World Athletics Indoor Tour

American Football
NFL

Mixed Martial Arts
UFC

Ice Hockey
IIHF World Championships (Top Division)

Non-Sport Shows
Sto Plexto (comedy Football Show) - Airs every Monday at 23:00 on Cosmote Sport 2HD
GameR1 (Gaming Show) - Airs every Friday at 22:30 on Cosmote Sport 1HD

External links
Official site 

Sports television networks
Television channels in Greece
Television channels and stations established in 2009
Greek-language television stations
Sports television in Greece